7two is an Australian free-to-air digital television multichannel, which was launched by the Seven Network on 1 November 2009.

The channel broadcasts a variety of programs, targeting a 25-and-over audience. 7two offers a broad selection of programs covering a variety of genres including lifestyle, drama, adventure, reality observational-documentaries and comedy.

History

The channel was officially announced by the Seven Network on its breakfast program, Sunrise, at 7:45am AEDT 23 October 2009. Earlier, speculation suggested that Seven would launch its secondary channel around November 2009, with possible names including 7PLUS, PLUS7, Channel Mate and 7TWO. Seven's then-programming chief Tim Worner stated after the reveal that some of the potential names were red herrings to keep details of the channel a secret. PLUS7 and Channel Mate (as 7mate) were later used for Seven's internet TV catch-up service and Seven's second digital multi-channel, respectively.

The channel launched with the airing of a promotional video called "It's Time", featuring Seven Network personalities and clips of shows and movies intended to be broadcast on the channel, followed by normal programming. This video was also launched on the multi-channel's website and received cross-promotion on the primary Seven channel. The Seven Network continues its policy of cross-promoting each channel's content across all four channels (Seven, 7two, 7mate and 7flix) to this day. Seven presenters Tom Williams and Johanna Griggs initially served as the "face" of the channel and were seen presenting 7two's Friday and Sunday night lifestyle line-ups in early 2011.

The channel did not launch on the same day to many regional areas. 7two was launched for Southern Cross Television viewers in Tasmania and Darwin on 1 December 2009, and for Prime Television viewers in Regional Victoria, Northern & Southern NSW and the ACT on 23 December 2009 from 9am. From launch, Prime broadcast the channel as '7TWO on Prime'.

In January 2011, regional broadcaster Prime Television changed the name of its primary channel to 'Prime7', to reflect its strong relationship with its metropolitan partner, Seven. This led to Prime's transmission of 7two being rebranded as simply 7two, like the metropolitan counterpart.

In July 2020, 7TWO underwent a major rebrand, its first since its inception. The logo applies the same orange 7 ribbon logo but with TWO in lower case and the channel now referred to as 7two.

Programming
From launch, premiere seasons of previous Seven shows including Lost, Ugly Betty, Heroes and 24 were broadcast, along with a mix of other new and classic programming along with movies sourced from Disney.
 
Prime-time programs used to screen under themed nightly blocks such as 'Action Time' and 'Movie Time', however these disappeared as the focus of the channel changed in 2010. The revised channel included 'Best of British' content such as thrice-weekly British murder/mystery (Heartbeat and Jonathan Creek), British comedy (Are You Being Served? and Keeping Up Appearances), and British lifestyle (Escape to the Country and Bargain Hunt). The launch of male-skewing sister channel 7mate in September 2010 led to a number of programs moving across from Seven's already existing channels, including 7TWO, to the new channel. 7TWO's target audience was also refined to people 55-plus. Programs that made the move from 7TWO included Air Crash Investigations, Scrubs, NWA: On Fire, Whacked Out Sports, Lost, Last Comic Standing, That '70s Show, AFL Game Day, Gary Unmarried, Club Reps, Fifth Gear, Monster Garage, and The Sopranos.

The weekday daytime schedule has seen numerous changes since launch as channel executives tried to find the right mix with viewers. At launch, 'Kid's Time' broadcast a block of children's programs each morning such as Count Duckula, and Digimon Data Squad, soap operas aired in the early afternoon and 'Kitchen Time' featured in the late afternoons with Essence of Emeril and The Martha Stewart Show among the programs broadcast. In 2010, soap operas including Shortland Street, Coronation Street and, briefly, Emmerdale and Hollyoaks joined classic Australian soap Sons and Daughters and early years of Home and Away into its mid-morning schedule along with early episodes of quiz show Deal Or No Deal. In early afternoon, a mix of repeated fare such as Mistresses, Murphy Brown, Doctor Finlay, and movies from the Sony Pictures library are shown. Occasionally, shows which first aired the previous night on the main Seven channel are encored on 7TWO during the day. While initially, dramas such as Grey's Anatomy were encored, more recently this has remained true only for Seven's local reality shows such as The X Factor and My Kitchen Rules. An early morning weekly omnibus of the previous week's new episodes of Home and Away airs on Sundays.

In 2012, the Seven Network introduced new weekday morning blocks of children's programming to air both on 7TWO and 7mate. Branded as Total Girl, the 7TWO block featured female-skewing Disney series such as Hannah Montana, Wizards of Waverly Place, Sonny with a Chance and Good Luck Charlie, while the 7mate block aired male-skewing programs branded as K-Zone. Saturday Disney aired on 7TWO from 2012 to 2016, for two hours of its weekly episode. From 2013 onwards, local Australian children's programs from the Seven Network were moved to air weekdays on 7TWO. These titles included game shows such as Match It, animated series such as The Deep, The Wild Adventures of Blinky Bill and Beat Bugs, and programs for preschoolers including Pipsqueaks.

In 2009, 2010 and 2011, 7TWO broadcast a wide range of both classic and new films that were sourced from RKO Radio Pictures, Icon Productions, Entertainment One, StudioCanal, Metro-Goldwyn-Mayer, United Artists, Orion Pictures, 20th Century Fox, Walt Disney Pictures, Pixar Animation Studios, Touchstone Pictures, Hollywood Pictures, Miramax Films, Dimension Films, DreamWorks Pictures, DreamWorks Animation, Paramount Pictures, Universal Pictures, Columbia Pictures, TriStar Pictures, and most recently starting from 2017, Warner Bros. Pictures and New Line Cinema.

By the end of Summer 2010/11, 7TWO had proven itself to become the most watched multi-channel in the country dominating primetime slots with a total 6.4% audience share via the network across the 5 major cities and winning 9 weeks over 9Go!'s two weeks (one joint with 7TWO) which is largely attributed to the channel's increased broadcast of British-originated content across the week. In 2011, following 9Go!'s ratings share success (for digital channels) in 2010, 7TWO has stolen their crown as the number one multi-channel and the number one most-watched multichannel of the decade and century in Australia.

Current programming

Comedy

 Mrs Brown's Boys (Repeats)
 The Vicar of Dibley (Repeats)

Soap opera

Coronation Street (2022–present)
Emmerdale (2022–present)

Documentary

 Air Crash Investigations (shared with Channel 7 and 7mate)
 Coastwatch NZ Cities of the Underworld I Shouldn't Be Alive This Rugged CoastDrama

 A Place to Call Home A Touch of Frost Body of Proof Doc Martin Downton Abbey Father Brown For Life Foyle's War The Indian Doctor Inspector George Gently The Inspector Lynley Mysteries  Inspector Morse Judge John Deed The Last Detective Murdoch Mysteries  Rosemary & Thyme Wire in the BloodGame shows
 Million Dollar Minute (repeats)
 The Chase UKLifestyle

 60 Minute Makeover Auction Squad Bargain Hunt Best Houses Australia Best House on the Street Better Homes and Gardens Creek to Coast Escape to the Continent Escape to the Country The Great South East Harry's Practice Homes Under the Hammer The Lucky Country Melbourne Weekender Mighty Cruise Ships Queensland Weekender Selling Houses Australia Sydney Weekender WA WeekenderLottery

  Monday Lotto Oz Lotto Tuesday  Wednesday Lotto  Powerball Thursday  Saturday Lotto 

News
 NBC Today NBC Meet the Press (moved from 7mate)

Reality
 RSPCA Animal RescueReligious
 Amazing Facts David Jeremiah It Is Written Michael YoussefSport
 Horse Racing on Seven Olympics on Seven Paralympics on SevenThe Cricket (When 7mate is broadcasting NFL)

Former programming

 Adult animation 
 King of the Hill Children's 

 Action Man A.T.O.M. (2009–10)
 A.N.T. Farm (2012–15)
 Austin & Ally (2013–16)
 Avenger Penguins (2009–11)
 Beat Bugs (2016, 2018, 2020)
 The Book Place (2010–11)
 Bottersnikes and Gumbles (2015–16, 2018–20)
 Bubble Town Club (2010–12)
 Castaway (2014)
 Combo Niños (2009–11)
 Count Duckula (2009–11)
 Danger Mouse (2009–11)
 The DaVincibles (2013–15)
 The Deep (2015–17, 2019)
 Digimon Data Squad (2009–11)
 Dive Olly Dive (2013–14)
 Dog with a Blog (2014–15)
 Drop Dead Weird (2017–19)
 The Emperor's New School (2010)
 Erky Perky (2013)
 Flipper (2009–11)
 Flushed (2015–20)
 Get Arty (2017–20)
 Get Clever (2018–20)
 Ghosts of Time (2013–15)
 Good Luck Charlie (2012–15)
 Gravity Falls (2015–16)
 Hairy Legs (2014–18)
 Hannah Montana (2012)
 Harry's Mad (2010)
 History Hunters (2013–15)
 I Didn't Do It (2015)
 I'm in the Band (2012–13)
 In Your Dreams (2013–17)
 It's Academic (2013–19)
 Jessie (2013–16)
 JONAS (2012)
 Kick Buttowski: Suburban Daredevil (2013)
 Kickin' It (2014–15)
 Kitty is Not a Cat (2017–20)
 Lab Rats (2015–16)
 Lab Rats Challenge (2013–15)
 Larry the Wonderpup (2018–20)
 Legend of Enyo (2013)
 Liv and Maddie (2014–15)
 Match It (2013–19)
 Motown Magic (2019)
 News of the Wild (2018–19)
 Mighty Med (2015)
 Oh Yuck! (2017–19)
 Pair of Kings (2012–13, 2016)
 Phineas and Ferb (2012–16)
 Power Rangers: Jungle Fury (2010–11)
 Power Rangers: Mystic Force (2009–10)
 Power Rangers: Operation Overdrive (2009–10)
 Power Rangers RPM (2010–11)
 PrankStars (2013–15)
 Press Gang (2010)
 Pucca (2009)
 The Replacements (2010–11)
 Sally Bollywood: Super Detective (2013–17)
 Saturday Disney (2012–16)
 Sea Princesses (2013–14)
 Shake It Up (2012–16)
 Sonny with a Chance (2012–13)
 So Random! (2012, 2014–15)
 Spit It Out (2013–15)
 Stitch! (2013)
 Tashi (2014–18)
 Teenage Fairytale Dropouts (2013–17)
 Trapped (2013)
 Treasure Island (2010)
 Ultimate Spider-Man (2014–15)
 Victor and Hugo: Bunglers in Crime (2009–10)
 The Wild Adventures of Blinky Bill (2016–18, 2020)
 The Wind in the Willows (2009–11)
 Win, Lose or Draw (2015)
 Wizards of Waverly Place (2012–14)
 The Woodlies (2013–16)
 Woof! (2010)
 Yin Yang Yo! (2009–10)
 Zeke and Luther (2012–16)
 Zeke's Pad (2013)
 ZooMoo (2016–20)

 Preschool 

 All for Kids (2013)
 The Fairies (2012)
 Handy Manny (2010–12)
 Jay's Jungle (2015–19)
 Lah-Lah's Adventures (2014–16)
 Larry the Lawnmower (2015–18)
 Mickey Mouse Clubhouse (2009–11)
 Pipsqueaks (2013–20)
 Raggs (2011–12)
 Toybox (2013–20)

 Comedy 

 Are You Being Served? As Time Goes By
 The Benny Hill Show Bewitched (Now on 9Go!)
 Big Bite Bless Me, Father Citizen Khan Dad's Army 
 Designing Women Doctor at Large Doctor at Sea Doctor in Charge Father Ted Fawlty Towers The Fenn Street Gang Fortysomething Full House Gavin & Stacey (Season 1 only)
 George and Mildred Growing Pains Head of the Class I Dream of Jeannie (Now on 9Go!)
 Kath & Kim Keeping Up Appearances (now on 9Gem)
 Kingswood Country Love Thy Neighbour M.A.S.H (will move to 9Go!)
 Mad About You 
 Man About the House Men Behaving Badly Mother and Son (ABC now has rights)
 Mrs Brown's Boys Murphy Brown One Foot in the Grave Perfect Strangers Please Sir! Samantha Who? Some Mothers Do 'Ave 'Em Step By Step That '70s Show Ugly Betty The Vicar of Dibley Who's The Boss? Documentary 

 Country Calendar 10 Things You Didn't Know About... Beyond Tomorrow Chris Tarrant: Extreme Railways 
 Coastwatch Oz The First 48 Forensic Investigators Globe Trekker The Great Australian Doorstep In The Bush with Malcolm Douglas India with Sanjeev Bhaskar Infamous Assassinations Inside Maximum Security Life Inside the Markets Man Made Marvels Michael Palin's New Europe Olympians – Off the Record SCU: Serious Crash Unit Super Factories Drama 

 24 (final season)
 All Saints Between The Lines The Bill (now on ABC)
 Black Sheep Squadron Blue Heelers Brothers & Sisters Castle Chicago Fire Cold Case (Now on 7flix)
 Commander in Chief Criminal Minds (now on 7flix)
 Dangerfield Dirty Sexy Money Doctor Finlay HolbyBlue Down to Earth Eli Stone Empire Endeavour Five Mile Creek Fortysomething Hart To Hart Heartbeat (Now on 9Gem)
 How to Get Away with Murder In Justice Jonathan Creek Kingdom Kings Kojak The Lakes Lewis Life Begins Mercy Minder 
 Mistresses Moonlighting Mr Selfridge Once Upon a Time (now on 7flix)
 Private Practice Revenge Royal Pains Shark The Shield Six Feet Under The Sopranos Waking the Dead Without a Trace (Now on 7flix)

 Lifestyle 

 Ainsley's Big Cook Out Antonio Carluccio's Southern Italian Feast Australia's Best Backyards Australia's Best Houses Beautiful Homes & Great Estates Chefs at Sea Ching's Kitchen Coastal Kitchen Coxy's Big Break Dinner in a Box Discover Tasmania Essence of Emeril The F Word (Australian TV Series)
 Fantasy Homes by the Sea Friends For Dinner Gardeners' World Gary Rhodes' Cookery Year Gary Rhodes' Local Food Heroes Giorgio Locatelli Pure Italian Going Bush The Great Outdoors The Hairy Bikers' Cookbook The Hook and the Cook Hot Property How Not to Decorate Intolerant Cooks Jamie's Outdoor Room James Martin: Yorkshire's Finest Lyndey Milan's Taste of Australia Make My Home Bigger The Martha Stewart Show Mercurio's Menu Restaurant Australia Room for Improvement SA Life Favourites The Travel Bug Travel Oz What's Up Downunder (now on Channel 10)

 Game shows 
 Deal or No Deal (repeats)
 The Master Light entertainment 

 Breaking the Magician's Code: Magic's Secrets Revealed (now on 7mate)
 Britain's Best Dish Club Reps (now on 7mate)
 The Emeril Lagasse Show I Survived a Japanese Game Show Kidspeak SellOut Where Are They Now? Reality 

 American Gladiators Animal Airport Animal Squad Beauty and the Geek Australia (Channel 7 encore)
 The Border Border Security USA Borderline Cheaters Dancing with the Stars Australia (Channel 7 encore)
 Destroyed in Seconds Disorderly Conduct: Caught on Tape Dog Patrol Dog Squad Downsize Me! Drug Bust Fifth Gear (now on 7mate)
 Four in a Bed Highway Patrol House Doctor Last Chance Learners Make Me A Supermodel (US) The Mole (second season)
 Monster Garage (now on 7mate)
 Monster House Neighbours at War The Real Seachange Restaurant Revolution (Channel 7 encore)
 Whacked Out Sports (now on 7mate)

 Religious 
 Leading the Way Soap opera 
 All My Children (2009–2011)
 Coronation Street Emmerdale headLand Hollyoaks (2010–2011)
 Home and Away (1988–1996)
 Home and Away: The Early Years (2009–2017)
 Shortland Street Sons and Daughters Sport 
 The Davis Cup FINA World Swimming Championships Others 

 Adventure Golf Ainsley's Gourmet Express America's Court with Judge Ross Animal Academy Around The World in Eighty Trades Australia's Wild Secrets Bazaar Cops, Cars and Superstars (now on 7mate)
 Cowboy Builders Escape to the Sun Barry Humphries' Flashbacks Human Body: Pushing the Limits Journey of a Lifetime Leading The Way with Dr Michael Youssef Leyland Brothers' World Live Healthy, Be Happy Murphy's Law My Shocking Story Maigret McCallum Medical Rookies MegaStructures Mighty Ships NWA: On Fire (now on 7mate)
 North Naked City Nick's Bistro Night Court Not Going Out Outback Wildlife Rescue One Foot in the Grave Only Fools And Horses Open All Hours Playing Tricks Pelican's Progress The People's Cookbook Pie in the Sky Prime Suspect (now on 9Gem)
 Ramsay's Boiling Point Rick Stein's Food Heroes River City Rome Royal Upstairs Downstairs Rebus Rhodes Across India Rick Stein's Seafood Lovers' Guide Route 66 The Royal Ruth Rendell Mysteries Safari Chef Scotland Revealed Second Sight Simply Baking South Street Cafe Strikeforce Style By Jury Seconds From Disaster Sophie's Sunshine Food Taggart Take on the Takeaway Tamasin's Weekends 
 That's My Boy The Food Truck The Jonathan Ross Show The Naked Chef The Professionals The Sweeney The Tanner Brothers The Unit Tin Man To The Manor Bowen Two's Company Taste Upstairs, Downstairs Vera Valerie / The Hogan Family Vicious Wedding Planner What A Carry On! What About Brian William and Mary (TV series) Wycliffe The Whistleblowers When Weather Changed History Wild Harvest with Nick Nairn World's Toughest Fixes World War II: The Lost FilmsNews
From launch until early 2013, 7two re-aired all daytime and prime-time national Seven News updates, no more than two commercial breaks after their original broadcast on the main Seven channel. These were all produced in Seven's Sydney news studio and presented by either Chris Bath or Mark Ferguson.

On 5 August 2013, a national news bulletin began airing on 7two, titled Seven News at 7, airing at 7:00pm Monday to Friday. It was presented by Melissa Doyle, with David Brown on weather. Many months after the Nine Network's rival 7pm bulletin on 9Gem had ended, 7two aired their last Seven News At 7 bulletin on 2 May 2014.

Sport
7two televised live coverage of tennis tournament Wimbledon for the first time in 2011, first going to air at 8:30pm AEST on 7two whilst the primary channel continued normal programming before switching over to Seven at around 10.30pm. This practice has continued each year since.Wimbledon 2013: guide, TV Tonight, 13 June 2013

Between 2012 and 2018, 7two televised smaller tennis tournaments from Seven's Summer of Tennis, including the Brisbane International, Sydney International and AAMI Classic. This allowed Seven's main channel to continue with normal programming. Between 2015 and 2018, 7two started providing secondary coverage of the Australian Open for the first week.

Further sports coverage on 7two includes Horse Racing.

In 2010, 7two broadcast classic AFL and Australian Open tennis matches from the Seven archives between midnight and dawn.

In August 2016, 7two broadcast the 2016 Summer Olympics and 2016 Summer Paralympics from Rio de Janeiro in September.

Availability

7two is available in standard definition digital in metropolitan areas and regional Queensland in High definition digital through Seven Network owned-and-operated stations including ATN Sydney, HSV Melbourne, BTQ Brisbane, SAS Adelaide, TVW Perth and STQ Queensland. As well as this, Southern Cross Television rebroadcast the service through TNT Tasmania and TND Darwin. Seven Regional (Regional NSW/ACT and VIC) also broadcasts 7two, which launched in these markets on 23 December 2009. WIN Television Griffith launched 7two on 5 June 2012, the day of the analogue switch off. Southern Cross Television (Regional SA, Central Australia) began broadcasting in January 2012 and GWN7 in Regional WA soon followed.

Logo and identity history

7TWO began transmission on 1 November 2009. Following the launch, the logo uses the generic Seven logo in an orange colour scheme, with the word "TWO" being added next to it. Despite the main logo being slightly changed in 2016, this logo is still in use as a secondary logo. On 24 January 2016, to coincide with new on-air presentation, 7TWO modified their 2009 logo slightly by downsizing the Seven logo.

On 24 July 2020, just days after 7mate's rebrand,  7TWO unveiled their new logo for the first time since its launch in 2009. The word "TWO" is now in a different font with the letters becoming lowercase to be now known as 7two. It was part of the Seven Network’s major rebrand of their multichannels.

Slogans

2009–2010: It's Time2010–2012: To Inspire, To Solve, To Laugh2012–2016: You Belong2016–2020: Can Do2020–present: Better Together''

See also

List of digital television channels in Australia

Notes

References

External links

Seven Network
Digital terrestrial television in Australia
English-language television stations in Australia
Television channels and stations established in 2009
2009 establishments in Australia